Siniküla is a village in Tartu Parish, Tartu County in eastern Estonia.  Prior to the 2017 administrative reform in Estonia of local governments, it was located in Laeva Parish.

References

 

Villages in Tartu County